Once Upon a Time When We Were Colored is a memoir by Clifton Taulbert, first published in 1989.  Taulbert writes about his life experiences from his childhood in a small Mississippi town during the segregated 1950s to his emigration North in 1962 at the age of 17.  The book won Taulbert a Pulitzer Prize nomination and was later made into a 1996 movie starring Phylicia Rashad, Richard Roundtree, Isaac Hayes, and Al Freeman, Jr.

See also
 Once Upon a Time...When We Were Colored

References

American memoirs
1989 non-fiction books
English-language novels